Andrei Anatolyevich Bukin (born 10 June 1957) is a Soviet and Russian former ice dancer who represented the Soviet Union in his competitive career. With his partner Natalia Bestemianova, he is the 1988 Olympic Champion, 1984 Olympic silver medalist, four-time World champion, three-time World silver medalist, and five-time European champion.

Career 
Bukin began figure skating at age seven, entering the Children and Youth Sports School of CSKA in Moscow. The group trained at a small stadium in Chapayevsky Park near Pesochnaya Square. At age ten, he joined Spartak and began ice dancing, originally training at the Small Sports Arena of the Central Lenin Stadium. In his early career, he was coached by Nadezhda Shirokova and his ice dancing partner was Olga Abankinka, whom he married. In 1977, he joined the group of the famous coach Tatiana Tarasova, who paired him with Natalia Bestemianova. Bukin was the USSR Olympic Team Flag Bearer at the 1988 Winter Olympics. The duo capped their lengthy career by winning the gold medal there and at that year's World Championships.

Personal life 
Bukin married former ice dancing partner, Olga Abankina, with whom he has a son Andrei (born 1983). With his current partner, Yelena Vasyukova, a former ice dancer, he has a son, Ivan Bukin, born in 1993, who is also a competitive ice dancer.

Competitive highlights

With Bestemianova

With Abankina

Programs 
(With Bestemianova)

References

External links
 "Bobrin's Moscow Stars on Ice official site"
 Care to Ice Dance? - Bestemianova & Bukin
  Biographies of Andrei and Natalia at Tatiana Tarasova's website

Navigation

1957 births
Living people
Figure skaters from Moscow
Russian State University of Physical Education, Sport, Youth and Tourism alumni
Honoured Masters of Sport of the USSR
Recipients of the Order of Friendship of Peoples
Recipients of the Order of the Red Banner of Labour
Olympic figure skaters of the Soviet Union
Figure skaters at the 1980 Winter Olympics
Figure skaters at the 1984 Winter Olympics
Figure skaters at the 1988 Winter Olympics
Olympic gold medalists for the Soviet Union
Olympic silver medalists for the Soviet Union
Olympic medalists in figure skating
Russian male ice dancers
Soviet male ice dancers
World Figure Skating Championships medalists
European Figure Skating Championships medalists
Medalists at the 1984 Winter Olympics
Medalists at the 1988 Winter Olympics